Alaa Al-Eryani (born 1990) is a filmmaker, photographer, writer, and feminist activist from Yemen.

Life
Born in Egypt, Al-Eryani was brought up in Sanaa. After gaining a degree in digital film and television from Limkokwing University, she returned to Yemen in 2012.  
In April 2013 Al-Eryani founded the Yemeni Feminist Movement, a project on Facebook and Twitter, and has subsequently faced threats for her promotion of women's rights.

In 2013 Al-Eryani was one of the first to write on the case of Nada al-Ahdal, the ten-year-old girl who uploaded a short YouTube video complaining that she was being forced into a marriage contract. She emphasised the difference in attitudes between rural and urban areas:

Filmography
Al-Eryani has directed two short films, Insight (2011) and Broken (2016).

References

External links
 
 Alaa Al-Eryani: Courageous Self Love, Girls' Globe, 20 November 2019

1990 births
Living people
Yemeni photographers
Yemeni film directors
Yemeni women's rights activists
Yemeni writers
Yemeni feminists